La Chica que Limpia also known in English as The Cleaning Lady is a Spanish-language Argentinian dramatic television show. The television series has been remade as La muchacha que limpia in Mexico, and as The Cleaning Lady in the United States. It debuted in 2017 on Cine.ar Play, and later aired on Canal 10 Cordoba. The series is composed of 13 episodes for a 30-minute timeslot. The television program won the Martín Fierro de Oro award in 2018.

The show was filmed in Córdoba, Argentina, and stars Antonella Costa as the titular cleaning lady, Rosa.

Synopsis
Single mother Rosa, a cleaning lady, is obsessive about her cleaning method, due to her 7-year-old son Felipe having an immunodeficiency disorder and needing to live in a sterile bubble. Her cleaning method comes to the attention of some of the ruthless gangsters in the city, who start using her as crime cleanup. She uses the large renumeration of her criminal cleaning jobs to help pay for her son's expensive medical treatments, which also puts her family's safety at risk. The series shows sexual exploitation, drug trafficking, sex trafficking, people trafficking, and does not show the protagonist always choosing the right side.

Cast of characters

Episodes

Awards and honours
 On 23 June 2018, the TV show won the Martín Fierro Federal de Oro award for televised fiction.

Legacy
 The show was remade for Mexican television as La Muchacha que Limpia, starting airing in 2021.
 The show was remade for American television as The Cleaning Lady, starting airing in 2022.

References

External links
 
 
 Tubi: La Chica Que Limpia (2017)

2010s Argentine drama television series
2017 Argentine television series debuts
2018 Argentine television series endings